Wēpiha Apanui (died 1880) was a Māori tribal leader and carver of New Zealand. He identified with the Ngāti Awa iwi of the eastern Bay of Plenty. He was trained as a carver by his father, Apanui Te Hāmaiwaho. His best known carvings include the Mataatua Wharenui in Whakatāne (1875), the Hotunui whare rūnanga in 1878 (now on display in the Auckland War Memorial Museum).

References

1880 deaths
Ngāti Awa people
New Zealand woodcarvers
New Zealand Māori carvers
Year of birth unknown